Newport Pan Lane railway station, was, for four years, the temporary terminus   of the Isle of Wight  (Newport Junction) Railway incorporated in 1868. Opened on 11 August 1875 and closed 4 years later  on 1 June 1879 when the line was extended northwards to link with the new Newport Station  (and thus the "Ryde and Newport Railway"). Any trace of the station has long since gone    and today the nearest landmark is an alleyway leading from the residential road called "Furlongs".

See also 

 List of closed railway stations in Britain

References

External links 
 Vivid memories of locality

Disused railway stations on the Isle of Wight
Former Isle of Wight Central Railway stations
Railway stations in Great Britain opened in 1875
Railway stations in Great Britain closed in 1879
Newport, Isle of Wight